Lissodendoryx is a genus of sponges belonging to the family Coelosphaeridae.

The genus has cosmopolitan distribution.

Species:

Lissodendoryx acanthostylota 
Lissodendoryx albemarlensis 
Lissodendoryx amaknakensis 
Lissodendoryx collinsi

References

Poecilosclerida
Sponge genera